"Soon" is a song by Belgian singer and songwriter Blanche. It was released as a digital download on 20 July 2018 by PIAS Belgium and it was later included in her debut studio album Empire. The song was written by Ellie Delvaux and Toma Médard.

Charts

Release history

References

2018 songs
2018 singles
Blanche (singer) songs
Songs written by Blanche (singer)